David John Russell (born 2 May 1954) is an English professional golfer.

Career
Russell was born in Birmingham, grew up in Bromsgrove and was educated at North Bromsgrove High School. He turned professional in 1973 and spent many years on the European Tour, making the top one hundred on the Order or Merit twelve times between 1979 and 1992, with a best ranking of 24th in 1985. His two European Tour wins came at the 1985 Car Care Plan International and the 1992 Lyon Open V33. In which he won playing the entire 72 holes without dropping a single shot

He retired from the European Tour to become the Club Professional at Kedleston Park Golf Club in 1996-2002.

In 2001, he designed and set up Archerfield Links in East Lothian where he still resides.

Russell joined the European Senior Tour on turning fifty and finished as runner-up in each of his first two senior tournaments. In 2005, in his first full season on the European Senior Tour, he had three more runner-up finishes and ended the season 8th place on the Order of Merit. In June 2010, he won his first title at the De Vere Collection PGA Seniors Championship.

Russell was selected by 2006 European Ryder Cup captain Ian Woosnam to be one of his assistants at the K Club.

Russell is a European Tour Board Member and is the European Senior Tour Chairman.

Russell's middle initial is almost always quoted in order to distinguish him from another English European Tour golfer of the same name, David A. Russell, who is three years younger.

Professional wins (7)

European Tour wins (2)

European Tour playoff record (0–1)

Other wins (2)
1994 Tournoi Perrier de Paris (with Peter Baker)
2012 Farmfoods British Par 3 Championship

European Senior Tour wins (2)

European Senior Tour playoff record (1–1)

Japan PGA Senior Tour wins (1)
2012 Fuji Film Senior Championship

Results in major championships

Note: Russell only played in The Open Championship.

CUT = missed the half-way cut (3rd round cut in 1973 and 1974 Open Championships)
"T" = tied

External links

English male golfers
European Tour golfers
European Senior Tour golfers
1954 births
Living people